Joaquín Paz (born 20 October 1993) is an Argentine international rugby union player who plays either as a fullback or centre.

Club career

Early in his career, Paz turned out for Argentine sides Pucará and Córdoba Atletico and graduated to senior rugby with Argentine Super Rugby franchise, the Jaguares, in 2016.   In their debut season in the competition, Paz made 5 substitute appearances.   It was to prove to be his only year with the team and he was off to Italy to join Rugby Calvisano ahead of the 2016-17 European season.

International career

Paz has represented his country at all levels from Under-19 upwards, including one appearance for the Pumas Sevens side at the Gold Coast Sevens in Australia in 2013.   He made his senior international debut against  in 2013, marking the occasion with a try, and followed it up with 2 more appearances in 2015.

Super Rugby Statistics

References

1993 births
Living people
Argentine rugby union players
Argentina international rugby union players
Argentina international rugby sevens players
Rugby union fullbacks
Rugby union centres
Jaguares (Super Rugby) players
Sportspeople from Córdoba, Argentina
Argentine expatriate rugby union players
Argentine expatriate sportspeople in Italy
Expatriate rugby union players in Italy
Male rugby sevens players
Rugby Calvisano players
Rugby Lyons Piacenza players